"Lullay, mine liking" is a Middle English lyric poem or carol of the 15th century which frames a narrative describing an encounter of the Nativity with a song sung by the Virgin Mary to the infant Christ. The refrain is an early example of an English lullaby; the term "lullaby" is thought to originate with the "lu lu" or "la la" sound made by mothers or nurses to calm children, and "by" or "bye bye", another lulling sound (for example in the similarly ancient Coventry Carol).

There are a number of surviving medieval English verses associated with the birth of Jesus which take the form of a lullaby, of which this is probably the most famous example. Written by an anonymous hand, the text is found uniquely in Sloane MS 2593, a collection of medieval lyrics now held in the British Library.

Originally intended to be sung, no evidence of the work's musical setting survives, and since its rediscovery and the musical possibilities suggested by the text have led to diverse interpretations by numerous composers including Philip Stopford, Edgar Pettman, Peter Warlock, R. R. Terry, Gustav Holst, Ronald Corp, David Willcocks, Philip Lawson, Alan Spedding, and Richard Rodney Bennett.

These are sometimes titled "I saw a fair maiden" whereas "Myn Lyking" is used in the versions by R.R. Terry and Ronald Corp (as the first of the latter's Three Medieval Carols).

Text

See also
 List of Christmas carols

References

15th-century poems
British poems
Middle English poems
English Christian hymns
Christmas carols
Sloane Manuscript 2593